Lu Shiow-yen (born 31 August 1961) is a Taiwanese politician and former television presenter. She is the incumbent Mayor of Taichung since 25 December 2018.

Education and early career
Lu earned a bachelor's degree from National Chengchi University, followed by a master's degree at Tamkang University. She worked for Chinese Television System, and won a Golden Bell Award in 1990.

Political career
Prior to winning her first election to the Legislative Yuan in 1998, Lu served a single term on the Taiwan Provincial Consultative Council.

2018 Taichung City mayor election
Lu resigned from the legislature in 20 November 2018 before the 2018 Taichung mayoral election, in which she defeated incumbent Lin Chia-lung.

References

External links

 

1961 births
Living people
Kuomintang Members of the Legislative Yuan in Taiwan
Mayors of Taichung
Politicians of the Republic of China on Taiwan from Keelung
Women mayors of places in Taiwan
Members of the 4th Legislative Yuan
Members of the 5th Legislative Yuan
Members of the 6th Legislative Yuan
Members of the 7th Legislative Yuan
Members of the 8th Legislative Yuan
Members of the 9th Legislative Yuan
Taichung Members of the Legislative Yuan
Taiwanese television presenters
National Chengchi University alumni
Tamkang University alumni
Taiwanese women television presenters